Emmeline (also spelled Emiline, Emmilene, Emmaline, or Ameline) is a female given name. The medieval name, a short form of Germanic names beginning with the element amal meaning "work". It was introduced to England by the Normans.

People 
Emmeline Hawthorne (born 1980), New Zealand actress
Emmaline Henry (1928–1979), American actress
Emmeline Hill (born 1974), Irish geneticist
Emmeline Lott, British writer
Emmeline Ndongue (born 1983), French basketball player
Emmeline Pankhurst (1858–1928), British political activist
Emmeline Pethick-Lawrence (1867–1954), British political activist
 Emmeline Stuart-Wortley (1806–1855), British writer
Emmeline B. Wells (1828–1921), American writer

Fiction
Emmeline, novel by Charlotte Turner Smith
Emmeline (book), by Judith Rossner
 Emmeline, an 1819 book by Mary Brunton
Emmeline (opera), composed by Tobias Picker with a libretto by JD McClatchy
Emmeline Lucas, fictional character also known as "Lucia", in the Mapp and Lucia series
Emmeline Vance, fictional character and member of the Order of the Phoenix in the Harry Potter series
Emmeline Frost-Summers from Marvel Comics
Emmeline Lestrange, fictional character in The Blue Lagoon

See also 
 Emeline (disambiguation)

Feminine given names